Fox8 (corporately stylised as FOX8, alternatively as Fox 8 or FOX 8) is an Australian pay television channel available on Foxtel, and Optus Television's subscription platforms. It is the most watched subscription television channel in Australia (with or without the timeshift) and broadcasts the highest rating non-sporting related program or event on subscription television in Australia, Australia's Next Top Model in 2009. A high definition version of the channel, Fox8HD, was launched on the Foxtel and Austar platforms on 15 November 2009.

History
The channel runs many programs produced by Fox and in fact was originally called "Fox" before adding the "8" to the title. The channel was found on channel 8 on Foxtel analogue and Austar standard and channel 108 on Foxtel Digital and Austar Digital. Fox8 is Foxtel's most popular subscription channel and peak channel. It is also News Corporation's peak Australian channel (similar to Sky1 in the UK and FX in the USA). FOX8 is one of the very few channels to have been continuously broadcast since Foxtel's foundation in 1995. During the late 1990s, Fox8 used to show Saturday Night NRL matches.

FOX8+2 was introduced with the Foxtel and Austar Digital Services on Channel 150. This allows the viewing of the same programs on Fox8, but two hours later. One of the known advantages of this TimeShift Channel, is that Western Australian viewers can see this channel at the correct time in their state as advertised. FOX8 and Foxtel have a deal with Network Ten to receive their shows bought from the USA Fox network. Some shows like this include The Simpsons, Futurama, and The Simple Life. During the migration to the digital platform, Foxtel's Fox Kids (similar to the US version) channel was discontinued in 2004 and a selection of its programming was moved to FOX8 in the early mornings.

The channel was rebranded significantly at the start of 2005, matching the American Fox channel's logo with the addition of the 8 at the end. FOX8's overall graphics also changed in style. Shortly after the rebranding, the station received its first official website. The website was relaunched in October 2005 as a fuller visual experience showing extracts from the top shows.

During the 2008 Beijing Olympic Games, the channel screened a 17-day, multiple animated show marathon named "Battle of the Animations" involving Family Guy, American Dad!, The Simpsons, Futurama and King of the Hill. The event concluded on Sunday 24 August with a smaller marathon involving the winning show, as chosen by the viewing audience over the course of the 17 days. The winning show was Family Guy.

On 1 November 2008, as part of the launch of a new channel named 111 HITS, many shows from Fox8 and other channels moved to 111 Hits. 111 Hits is a hit shows channel including programs from the 80s, 90s, 2000s, and today.

On 15 November 2009, FOX8 HD launched on Austar and Foxtel.

On 16 March 2010, FOX8 launched a brand new website.

In May 2011, FOX8 underwent a major rebrand, incorporating a new look, with a new style of branding programs.

In October 2011, FOX8 launched a Program Return Graphic during a Show.

In February 2013, Foxtel announced a deal with The Walt Disney Company which included an exclusive output deal with ABC Family. ABC Family produces some of FOX8's hit programs such as Bunheads, Switched at Birth and The Secret Life of the American Teenager, as well as The Fosters and Twisted which were to premiere later in 2013.

In October 2013, FOX8 launched a new on-air look that included the new slogan TV for the Now Gen (replacing So Fox8).

On 12 December 2022, it was confirmed that Fox8 would be taking The Simpsons and all other Fox adult animation shows off the network in a move to revamp the channel as well as encourage viewers to sign up to Disney+, which has all Fox adult animation shows and which is also available as an app on Foxtel. A final Simpsons marathon aired on the network on 31 December 2022.

Programming

Current programming

Original programming
The Recruit (2014, 2016)

Acquired programming
The 100 
A.P.B.
Archer
Arrow
Batwoman
The Carbonaro Effect
DC's Legends of Tomorrow
Ellen's Game of Games
Empire
The Flash
Good Trouble
Godzilla: The Series
The Great North
Grown-ish
Guessable'
Harley Quinn
Kung Fu
Last Man Standing
Last Week Tonight with John Oliver
Legacies
Motherland: Fort Salem
New Girl
Pennyworth
Power Book II: Ghost
Regular Old Bogan
Rick and Morty
Roast Battle
RockWiz February 24 2023
Sleepy Hollow
Stargirl
Stitchers
Strike Back
Supergirl
Superman & Lois
Supernatural
Superstore
Taskmaster
Tacoma FD
Ten 7 Aotearoa
The Titan Games
The Real Ghostbusters
The Misery Index
Top 20 Funniest
Tosh.0
The Office
Ultimate Fighting Championship
Velma
Wipeout
Wipeout (TBS reboot)
WWE:
Raw (LIVE since 4 February 2014)
SmackDown (LIVE since 20 July 2016)
NXT (LIVE since January 2020)
Young Rock

Future programming
The Amazing Race

Former programming

Original programming
Action Earth (2007)
An Aussie Goes Barmy (2006)
An Aussie Goes Bolly (Filmed and copyrighted in 2007) (Aired in 2008)
An Aussie Goes Calypso (2008)
Australia's Next Top Model (2005–2016)
Blood, Sweat and Gears (2008)
CD Live (2006)
Confidential (2007)
The Contender Australia (2009)
Crown Australian Celebrity Poker Challenge (2006)
Dangerous (2007)
Dating in the Dark Australia (2010-2012)
The Face Australia (2014)
Fish Out of Water (2007)
Football Superstar (2008–2010)
Ra (2005 – present)
Rove LA (2011-2012)
The Phone (2009)
Runway to LA (2007)
The Singing Office (2007)
SLiDE (2011)
The Stafford Brothers (2011)
Cricket Superstar (2012)

Acquired programming
Two Guys and a Girl
2 Broke Girls
3rd Rock from the Sun
7th Heaven
8 Simple Rules
About a Boy
According to Jim
Alien Nation
American Dad! (moved to 7mate, 7flix and Disney+)
America's Most Wanted
America’s Next Top Model
American Idol (moved to Channel 9 and 9Go!)
Andromeda
Angry Birds Toons
Angry Little Asian Girl
Atlantis
Baby Daddy
Bates Motel (moved to SoHo)
The Best Years
Bitten
Blood Ties
Bob's Burgers (moved to Disney+)
Border Security: Australia's Front Line
Border Security: International
Bones (moved to SoHo)
Breaking the Magician's Code: Magic's Biggest Secrets Finally Revealed
The Carrie Diaries
Celebrity Poker Showdown
Chasing Life
Chicago Fire (moved to SoHo in 2015, returning November 2016)
Chuck
The Cleveland Show (moved to 7mate and Disney+ and starting in 2023 on 7flix)
Clubhouse 
The Collector
The Contender
The Crazy Ones
Criss Angel Mindfreak
Cristela
The Cut
Dating in the Dark
Dead Like Me
The District
Dog the Bounty Hunter (moved to A&E)
Dollhouse
The Face
Falling Skies 
Fastlane
Family Guy (moved to 7mate, 7flix and Disney+)
Fear Factor 
Finding Carter 
Futurama (moved to 7flix and Disney+)
The Gates
Glee
Gossip Girl
Got to Dance
Greek
Grimm
Hannibal (moved to Showcase)
Hart of Dixie
The Hills
Highway Patrol
The Hughleys
Human Weapon
Ice Road Truckers (moved to A&E)
Impact Wrestling (moved to Fuel TV)
The Inside
Jane By Design
jPod
Jane the Virgin
Jurassic Fight Club
Killer Magic
King of the Hill (moved to Disney+)
The King of Queens
Kröd Mändoon and the Flaming Sword of Fire
K-Ville
Kyle XY
Legend of the Seeker 
Less Than Perfect
Listen Up!
Live to Dance
The Lying Game
Make It Or Break It
Marvel's Agents of S.H.I.E.L.D. 
Maximum Exposure
The Mentalist (moved to TVH!TS)
The Messengers
The Mob Doctor
Modern Family (moved to FOX Funny)
Mutant X
MXC
My Big Fat Obnoxious Boss 
My Wife and Kids
NCIS: Los Angeles (moved to TVH!TS)
New Zealand's Next Top Model
Nikita
On the Lot
The Originals
The Others
Pretty Little Liars
Pineapple Dance Studios 
Point Pleasant
Prison Break (moved to FX)
Relic Hunter
Revolution
Roswell
Scare Tactics
The Secret Circle
The Secret Life of the American Teenager
The Simpsons (moved to 7flix and Disney+)
Skins
Smallville
Solitary
South Beach
Standoff
Still Standing
Strip Search
S.W.A.T.
Sweet Valley High
Switched at Birth
Teen Wolf
Temptation Island
That 70s Show
Terminator: The Sarah Connor Chronicles
Texas S.W.A.T.
Third Watch
Twisted
Two and a Half Men
Unan1mous
The Vampire Diaries
Vice
Ultimate Gamer
Walker, Texas Ranger
Wonderfalls
World Poker Tour
World's Most Amazing Videos
World's Wildest Police Videos
WWE:
ECW
Heat
Main Event
Superstars
Tough Enough
Vintage Collection
Yes, Dear
Young & Hungry

Fox 8 Kids programming
Fox 8 Kids was a programming block that aired after the closing of Fox Kids in 2004. This did not last very long.
Braceface
Digimon
Gadget and the Gadgetinis
Sailor Moon
Shin Chan
Sagwa, the Chinese Siamese Cat (unconfirmed)
The Cuties (2006)

Logos

See also

Television in Australia

References

External links
Fox8 Website

1995 establishments in Australia
English-language television stations in Australia
Television networks in Australia
Television channels and stations established in 1995
Foxtel